Çaltılı can refer to the following villages in Turkey:

 Çaltılı, Kahta
 Çaltılı, Karayazı
 Çaltılı, Mut
 Çaltılı, Savaştepe
 Çaltılı, Sındırgı